G4techTV was a short-lived American cable and satellite channel resulting from a merger between Comcast-owned G4 and TechTV. The network officially launched on May 28, 2004.

History

On March 25, 2004, Comcast announced its plans to purchase TechTV, a channel devoted to computers and technology. The purchase was completed on May 10, 2004, allowing Comcast to merge their G4 station with the newly acquired TechTV, resulting in G4techTV. G4techTV officially launched in the United States on May 28, 2004.

G4techTV kept shows from TechTV, such as The Screen Savers, as well as shows previously on G4, such as The Electric Playground. The merger caused one of TechTV's most prominent personalities, Leo Laporte, to leave the channel because of a contract dispute. Laporte had been the host of Call for Help, a call-in help show, which was cut after the merger. A new Call for Help series hosted by Leo Laporte began airing on G4techTV Canada (now called G4 Canada), the Canadian affiliate of G4techTV, on August 16, 2004; the series ended on February 26, 2007. The Lab with Leo Laporte replaced Call for Help in April 2007 before ending in August 2008. The Canadian produced version of the show was briefly aired in the United States from August 2005 to January 2006, though individual episodes could have been purchased through Google Video in the U.S.

On November 11, 2004, G4techTV announced that many of its employees, including Alex Albrecht and Yoshi DeHerrera, were terminated. This came as a shock to many, and outrage and anger were expressed on the G4techTV forums. G4techTV also announced the cancellation of its popular late night variety show, Unscrewed with Martin Sargent, along with its weekly news program Pulse. Unscrewed's host and supporting staff were terminated.

On February 15, 2005, less than a year after the merger, TechTV was officially dropped from the network's name, and the network's name changed to just G4.

On December 31, 2014, NBCUniversal discontinued all operations for G4; it was later relaunched on November 16, 2021, under Comcast Spectacor until that too closed on November 16, 2022.

G4techTV Canada

The G4techTV Canada channel launched on May 28, 2004, through a partnership with G4 Media, Rogers Media and Shaw Communications, as a domestic Canadian channel called G4techTV Canada. It was similar to G4techTV, but with more of an emphasis on technology-related programming per its CRTC licence requirements. G4techTV Canada kept the G4techTV name until mid-2009 when TechTV was dropped from the network's name to simply become G4 Canada.

Shows
The shows listed below reflect the schedule of G4techTV until February 15, 2005, when the network's name was reverted to G4.	 
			
 Anime Unleashed 	 
 Arena 	
 Body Hits
 Cheat! 	 
 Cinematech 	
 The Electric Playground 	
 Eye Drops 
 Filter 	
 Fresh Gear
 Future Fighting Machines 
 G4 Sports
 G4techTV Specials
 G4tv.com 	 
 Icons 	 
 Invent This!
 Judgment Day 	 
 Nerd Nation
 Players 	 
 Pulse
 Robot Wars 	 
 Sweat 
 The Screen Savers 	 
 Thunderbirds Unscrewed with Martin Sargent X-Play''

Notes

G4tv.com - Press Releases - Comcast Completes acquisition of TechTV via the Internet Archive

G4 Media
TechTV
Television channels and stations established in 2004
Defunct television networks in the United States
Television channels and stations disestablished in 2005